Euleia fratria is a species of tephritid or fruit flies in the genus Euleia of the family Tephritidae. The species was first classified in 1862, and is native to North America.

References

fratria